The Schooldays of Jesus is a 2016 novel by J. M. Coetzee. It is Coetzee's 13th novel and is a sequel to the 2013 novel The Childhood of Jesus. It resumes the story of a young boy named David who is brought up in a foreign land.

In July 2016, it was longlisted for the 2016 Man Booker Prize.

Awards and honors
2016 Man Booker Prize, longlistee.

References

2016 novels
21st-century South African novels
Novelistic portrayals of Jesus
Sequel novels